The 2008–09 Ligat Nashim was the 11th season of women's league football under the Israeli Football Association.

The league was won by Maccabi Holon, its sixth consecutive title. By winning, Maccabi Holon qualified to 2009–10 UEFA Women's Champions League.

League table

Top scorers

References
Israeli Football Association

Ligat Nashim seasons
1
women
Israel